On 29 November 2017, Victoria became the first Australian state to pass legislation allowing assisted suicide.  The law gives anyone suffering a terminal illness, with less than six months to live, the right to end their life.  The law had an 18-month implementation period, and came into effect on 19 June 2019.

The Bill
On 20 September 2017, the Voluntary Assisted Dying Bill 2017 was introduced into the Legislative Assembly of the Victorian Parliament by the Andrews Labor Government. The bill is modelled on the recommendations of an expert panel chaired by former Australian Medical Association president Professor Brian Owler. The proposed legislation was said by proponents to be the most conservative in the world; it contains 68 safeguards including measures designed to protect vulnerable people from coercion and abuse, as well as a Review Board to promote compliance. Labor and Coalition MPs were allowed a conscience vote on the Bill.

The bill was debated in the lower house over three sitting days, passing the assembly without amendment on 20 October 2017 after an emotional and tense debate which lasted more than 24 hours. The bill was passed by 47 votes to 37. The bill moved to the Legislative Council for debate.

Former Prime Minister Paul Keating spoke out against the passing of the bill to the upper house saying "the passage of the Voluntary Assisted Dying Bill through the Victorian lower house is truly a sad moment for the whole country."

The Prime Minister at the time, Malcolm Turnbull, who is also against euthanasia, said:It is the Victorian parliament's job to do this, I'm not a supporter of euthanasia but I have been following the debate and it would be very interesting to see if their upper house passes it and what follows on from it. ... Federal law prevails over a state law but only in an area that both the Commonwealth and the state parliament have jurisdiction, so you've got to begin with an area where the federal parliament has jurisdiction.

On 14 November 2017, the government agreed to a series of amendments designed to garner further support for the bill in the council. For terminally ill adults in severe pain and with only 12 months to live, the deadline to access lethal drugs was cut to six months, except for sufferers of neurodegenerative conditions such as motor neurone disease and multiple sclerosis. Additionally, an amendment restricting this scheme to people who have lived in Victoria for 12 months was accepted, as was a requirement for a death to be documented as assisted dying, in addition to noting the underlying disease. Funding for palliative care in regional areas was also increased as part of the agreement. On 22 November 2017, the bill in its amended form passed the council by 22 votes to 18, after a marathon sitting lasting more than 28 hours.

The bill returned to the Legislative Assembly for consideration of the council's amendments. The Assembly approved of the council's amendments on 29 November 2017. In passing the legislation, Victoria became the first state to legalise assisted suicide. The law received royal assent on 5 December 2017, and came into effect on 19 June 2019. The 18-month period allowed for implementation of the scheme including establishment of a review board.

Reactions
Kathy Eagar, the executive director of the Australian Palliative Care Outcomes Collaboration, and director of the Australian Health Services Research Institute at the University of Wollongong, has analysed the statistics surrounding euthanasia internationally, and says the law is limited. According to Eagar, the most important reason people choose euthanasia is that they don't want to lose their independence and autonomy. She believes euthanasia is a social issue and not a health issue, and maintains that less than one in five people choose euthanasia due to pain.

Lorraine Baker, the Victorian President of the Australian Medical Association, said that the passing of the legislation marked a "significant shift" in medical practice in Victoria, but the conscientious objection provisions contained in the legislation would ensure that doctors would not be forced into taking part in voluntary assisted dying. 

Euthanasia advocate Philip Nitschke called the law "beg and grovel legislation" because people will only be able to access it as a privilege granted in extremis rather than as a right to be accessed at a time nominated by the patient.

First use

Kerry Robertson was the first person to be granted a permit under the Voluntary Assisted Dying Act.  Robertson was diagnosed with breast cancer in 2010 and was declared cancer free after surgery, chemotherapy and radiation treatment.  Four years later she developed a tumour in her in bones, that spread to her lungs and brain.  When the cancer spread to her liver Robertson ceased treatment.  Her palliative care team was unable to ease the pain.  Robertson applied for the permit on the first day the act came into force, 19 June 2019, citing "loss of joy" as her reason.  Robertson ended her life on 15 July 2019 at the age of 61 with her two daughters, and best friend by her side.

See also

Euthanasia in Australia
Health care in Australia
Voluntary assisted dying in Western Australia
Euthanasia in New Zealand
Oregon Death With Dignity Act
California End of Life Option Act
Assisted suicide

References

Further reading

Victoria's hub for health services and business - Voluntary Assisted Dying Bill

Euthanasia in Australia
Health law in Australia
Assisted suicide
Disability rights
Humanism